Kurt Baptiste (born 15 March 1991) is a Papua New Guinea international rugby league footballer who plays as a  for the Sunshine Coast Falcons in the Queensland Cup.

He has also previously played for the Brisbane Broncos, Canberra Raiders, Sydney Roosters and the North Queensland Cowboys in the NRL, and the Leigh Centurions in the Betfred Championship.

Early life
Born in Brisbane, Queensland, Australia, Baptiste is of Papua New Guinean descent through his Samarai-born father Bevan. He played his junior rugby league for the Aspley Devils and attended Wavell State High School, where he represented the Australian Schoolboys in 2008, before being signed by the Brisbane Broncos.

Playing career

Brisbane Broncos
In 2009, he represented the Queensland under-18 team in their 24–6 loss to New South Wales under-18.

In Round 12 of the 2011 NRL season, Baptiste made his NRL debut for the Broncos in their 34-10 loss to the Manly-Warringah Sea Eagles at Suncorp Stadium. He scored the first try of his NRL career in the Broncos' Round 16, 16-12 loss to the South Sydney Rabbitohs in Perth, Western Australia. Baptiste only played 1 game for the Broncos in 2012, in the Broncos' 30-6 win over the Canberra Raiders at Suncorp Stadium, spending much of the season playing for the Norths Devils, one of the Broncos' feeder teams, in the Queensland Cup.

In 2012 and 2013, he played for the Queensland Residents against the New South Wales Residents.

Canberra Raiders
On 18 November 2013, Baptiste signed a 1-year contract with the Canberra Raiders starting in 2014. On 3 September 2014, Baptiste re-signed with the Raiders on a 2-year contract.

In 2016, Baptiste became a crucial member of the Raiders team, playing in 24 of their 27 matches. On 7 May 2016, he made his international debut for Papua New Guinea against Fiji in the 2016 Melanesian Cup.

On 17 November 2016, Baptiste re-signed with the Raiders on a two-year deal.

In December 2016, Baptiste ruptured his Achilles during pre-season training, which saw him miss half of the 2017 NRL season. He returned in Round 14 of the 2017 season, playing just 11 games for the Raiders. In late 2017, he represented Papua New Guinea at the 2017 Rugby League World Cup, playing four games.

Leigh Centurions
On 18 December 2017, Baptiste joined English Championship club Leigh Centurions on a one-year deal. On 4 March 2018, after playing just one game for the club, he was granted a release from his contract due to personal and family reasons.

Sydney Roosters
On 14 March 2018, Baptiste returned to Australia, signing a one-year deal with the Sydney Roosters. In June, he came off the interchange for Papua New Guinea in their 26–14 win over Fiji. He made just 9 appearances for the Roosters during the 2018 NRL season, spending the majority of the season playing for their Intrust Super Premiership feeder club, the Wyong Roos.

North Queensland Cowboys
On 11 October 2018, Baptiste joined the North Queensland Cowboys on a one-year deal. After missing the entire pre-season and first two rounds due to injury, Baptiste played two games for the Northern Pride, the Cowboys' Queensland Cup feeder club.

In Round 5 of the 2019 NRL season, Baptiste made his debut for the Cowboys in their loss to the Melbourne Storm. Baptiste played just eight more games for the Cowboys in 2019 before tearing his anterior cruciate ligament (ACL) in Papua New Guinea's loss to Samoa in June, ruling him out for the season.

On 13 September 2019, it was announced that he would not be re-signed by the Cowboys. In 2020, he joined the Easts Tigers in the Queensland Cup.

Canberra Raiders (second stint)
On 4 August 2020, Baptiste re-signed with the Canberra Raiders until the end of the season, following the cancellation of the 2020 Queensland Cup season.

Achievements and accolades

Individual
NYC Team of the Year: 2011

Statistics
 Statistics are correct to the end of the 2019 season

NRL

Championship

International

References

External links

North Queensland Cowboys profile
NRL profile

1991 births
Living people
Australian people of Papua New Guinean descent
Australian rugby league players
Brisbane Broncos players
Canberra Raiders players
Leigh Leopards players
Mount Pritchard Mounties players
North Queensland Cowboys players
Northern Pride RLFC players
Norths Devils players
Papua New Guinea national rugby league team players
Rugby league hookers
Rugby league players from Brisbane
Souths Logan Magpies players
Sydney Roosters players
Sunshine Coast Falcons players